This is a list of earthquakes in Thailand:

Earthquakes

References 

Sources

Thailand
Earthquakes